Beldin may refer to:
A character in The Belgariad and The Malloreon, see List of The Belgariad and The Malloreon characters#Disciples of Aldur
Diphenhydramine, by the trade name Beldin